Lilies are members of Lilium, a genus of herbaceous flowering plants.

Lilies may also refer to:

Lilies (film), a 1996 Canadian film by John Greyson
Lilies (play), a 1987 play by Michel Marc Bouchard
Lilies (TV series), a 2007 British period-drama series
Lilies (Arovane album) or the title song, 2004
Lilies (Melanie De Biasio album) or the title song, 2017
"Lilies", a song by Bat for Lashes from The Haunted Man, 2012
"Lilies", a 1958 short story by Ru Zhijuan
Lilys, an American rock band

See also
 
 
 Lily (disambiguation)